Syringa vulgaris, the lilac or common lilac, is a species of flowering plant in the olive family Oleaceae, native to the Balkan Peninsula, where it grows on rocky hills. Grown for its scented flowers in spring, this large shrub or small tree is widely cultivated and has been naturalized in parts of Europe, Asia and North America. It is not regarded as an aggressive species. It is found in the wild in widely scattered sites, usually in the vicinity of past or present human habitations.

Description
The bark is grey to grey-brown, smooth on young stems, longitudinally furrowed, and flaking on older stems. The leaves are simple,  and 3–8 cm broad, light green to glaucous, oval to cordate, with pinnate leaf venation, a mucronate apex, and an entire margin. They are arranged in opposite pairs or occasionally in whorls of three. The flowers have a tubular base to the corolla 6–10 mm long with an open four-lobed apex 5–8 mm across, usually lilac to mauve, occasionally white. The fruit is a dry, smooth, brown capsule, 1–2 cm long, splitting in two to release the two-winged seeds.

Taxonomy and naming
Syringa vulgaris was first formally described by Carl Linnaeus in 1753 and the description was published in Species Plantarum. The Latin specific epithet vulgaris means "common" (in the sense of "widespread").

Garden history
Lilacs—both S. vulgaris and S. × persica the finer, smaller "Persian lilac", now considered a natural hybrid—were introduced into northern European gardens at the end of the 16th century, from Ottoman gardens, not through botanists exploring the Balkan habitats of S. vulgaris. The Holy Roman Emperor's ambassador, Ogier Ghiselin de Busbecq, is generally credited with supplying lilac slips to Carolus Clusius, about 1562. Well-connected botanists, such as the great herbalist John Gerard, soon had the rarity in their gardens: Gerard noted that he had lilacs growing "in very great plenty" in 1597, but lilacs were not mentioned by Shakespeare, and John Loudon was of the opinion that the Persian lilac had been introduced into English gardens by John Tradescant the elder. Tradescant's Continental source for information on the lilac, and perhaps ultimately for the plants, was Pietro Andrea Mattioli, as one can tell from a unique copy of Tradescant's plant list in his Lambeth garden, an adjunct of his Musaeum Tradescantianum; it was printed, though probably not published, in 1634: it lists Lilac Matthioli. That Tradescant's "lilac of Mattioli's" was a white one is shown by Elias Ashmole's manuscript list, Trees found in Mrs Tredescants Ground when it came into my possession (1662): "Syringa alba".

In the American colonies, lilacs were introduced in the 18th century. Peter Collinson, F.R.S., wrote to the Pennsylvania gardener and botanist John Bartram, proposing to send him some, and remarked that John Custis of Virginia had a fine "collection", which Ann Leighton interpreted as signifying common and Persian lilacs, in both purple and white, "the entire range of lilacs possible" at the time.

It is also slowly making its way into the world of bonsai where it is loved for its flowers and multistem features.

Cultivation
The lilac is a very popular ornamental plant in gardens and parks, because of its attractive, sweet-smelling flowers, which appear in early summer just before many of the roses and other summer flowers come into bloom.

In late summer, lilacs can be attacked by powdery mildew, specifically Erysiphe syringae, one of the Erysiphaceae. No fall color is seen and the seed clusters have no aesthetic appeal.

Common lilac tends to flower profusely in alternate years, a habit that can be improved by deadheading the flower clusters after the color has faded and before seeds, few of which are fertile, form. At the same time, twiggy growth on shoots that have flowered more than once or twice can be cut to a strong, outward-growing side shoot.

It is widely naturalised in western and northern Europe. In a sign of its complete naturalization in North America, it has been selected as the state flower of the state of New Hampshire, because it "is symbolic of that hardy character of the men and women of the Granite State". Additional hardiness for Canadian gardens was bred for in a series of S. vulgaris hybrids by Isabella Preston, who introduced many of the later-blooming varieties. Their later-developing flower buds are better protected from late spring frosts. The Syringa × prestoniae hybrids range primarily in the pink and lavender shades.

Cultivars
Between 1876 and 1927, the nurseryman Victor Lemoine of Nancy, France, introduced over 153 named cultivars, many of which are considered classics and still in commerce today. Lemoine's "French lilacs" extended the limited color range to include deeper, more saturated hues, and many of them are double-flowered "sports", with the stamens replaced by extra petals.

AGM cultivars
In the UK the following cultivars of Syringa vulgaris have received the Royal Horticultural Society's Award of Garden Merit:

With single flowers:

 'Andenken an Ludwig Späth' (deep pink/red)
 'Esther Staley' (S. × hyacinthiflora - pale lilac flowers)
 'Firmament' (pale lilac-blue)
 'Sensation' (purple flowers edged white)
 'Vestale' (pure white flowers)

With double flowers:

'Katherine Havemeyer' (lilac)
'Madame Lemoine' (white)
'Mrs Edward Harding' (deep pink/red)
'Primrose' (pale yellow flowers)

Other uses
The flowers of common lilac are edible and used for flavoring honeys, sugars, food and other sweets.

Gallery

References

External links

 
 

Flora of Europe
Garden plants
Medicinal plants
Plants described in 1753
Taxa named by Carl Linnaeus
Plants used in bonsai
vulgaris
Symbols of New York (state)